Gerhard Truntschka (born September 10, 1958 in Landshut, West Germany) is a retired professional ice hockey player who played in the Ice hockey Bundesliga.

Playing career
Truntschka played for Kölner Haie and DEG Metro Stars.  He played for West Germany 1984 Canada Cup as well as three Winter Olympics.  He competed for the West German national team at the 1980 Winter Olympics and also played for the German national team at the 1992 Winter Olympics.

Career statistics

Regular season and playoffs

International

Sources

1958 births
DEG Metro Stars players
German ice hockey centres
Eishockey-Bundesliga players
Ice hockey players at the 1980 Winter Olympics
Ice hockey players at the 1984 Winter Olympics
Ice hockey players at the 1988 Winter Olympics
Ice hockey players at the 1992 Winter Olympics
Kölner Haie players
Living people
Olympic ice hockey players of Germany
Olympic ice hockey players of West Germany
Sportspeople from Landshut
St. Louis Blues draft picks
West German ice hockey centres